Timmins was a federal electoral district represented in the House of Commons of Canada from 1949 to 1979. It was located around the city of Timmins in the northeastern part of the province of Ontario. This riding was created in 1947 from parts of Cochrane and Timiskaming ridings.

It consisted of portions of the territorial districts of Timiskaming and Cochrane.

The electoral district was abolished in 1976 when it was redistributed between Timiskaming and Timmins—Chapleau ridings.

Electoral history

|-
  
|Liberal
|Karl EYRE
|align="right"| 7,949
 
|Co-operative Commonwealth
|Leo P. LALONDE
|align="right"|5,517 
  
|Progressive Conservative
|Percy BOYCE
|align="right"| 4,377

|}

|-
  
|Liberal
|Karl EYRE
|align="right"|5,541 
 
|Co-operative Commonwealth
|Arnold PETERS
|align="right"| 4,686 
  
|Progressive Conservative
|Maurice BÉLANGER
|align="right"| 3,348 

|}

|-
 
|Co-operative Commonwealth
|Murdo MARTIN
|align="right"| 6,776   
  
|Liberal
|Joseph J. EVANS
|align="right"|6,290 
  
|Progressive Conservative
|Percy BOYCE
|align="right"| 4,423 
|}

|-
 
|Co-operative Commonwealth
|Murdo MARTIN
|align="right"| 7,342 
  
|Progressive Conservative
| Émile BRUNETTE  
|align="right"| 6,252   
  
|Liberal
|Joseph J. EVANS
|align="right"| 5,719
|}

|-
 
|New Democratic Party
|Murdo MARTIN
|align="right"|8,834   
  
|Liberal
|Émile CLÉMENT
|align="right"|5,439 
  
|Progressive Conservative
|Mary GAUTHIER
|align="right"|  4,676 

|}

|-
 
|New Democratic Party
|Murdo MARTIN
|align="right"|8,452   
  
|Liberal
|Leo DEL VILLANO
|align="right"| 7,592 
  
|Progressive Conservative
|Émile BRUNETTE 
|align="right"| 3,068

|}

|-
 
|New Democratic Party
|Murdo MARTIN
|align="right"|10,071    
  
|Liberal
|Elmer E. SMITH
|align="right"|  6,456 
  
|Progressive Conservative
|Bob KILLINGBECK
|align="right"| 2,715 
 
|Independent
|John James BUCHAN
|align="right"| 100   
|}

|-
  
|Liberal
|Jean ROY  
|align="right"| 11,141 
 
|New Democratic Party
|Murdo MARTIN
|align="right"|8,807 
  
|Progressive Conservative
|Wyman BREWER
|align="right"| 2,118   
|}

|-
  
|Liberal
|Jean ROY
|align="right"| 10,804
 
|New Democratic Party
|Murdo MARTIN
|align="right"|9,819 
  
|Progressive Conservative
|Bill HICKEY
|align="right"|2,997 

|}

|-
  
|Liberal
|Jean ROY
|align="right"|12,904 
 
|New Democratic Party
|Wally RANTALA
|align="right"| 7,681 
  
|Progressive Conservative
|John HUGGINS
|align="right"| 4,098

|}

See also 
 List of Canadian federal electoral districts
 Past Canadian electoral districts

External links 
 Website of the Parliament of Canada

Former federal electoral districts of Ontario
Politics of Timmins